Benjamín Vicuña Mackenna (August 25, 1831 – January 25, 1886) was a Chilean writer, journalist, historian and politician. Vicuña Mackenna was of Irish and Basque descent.

Biography
Benjamín Vicuña Mackenna was born in Santiago, the son of Pedro Félix Vicuña and Carmen Mackenna Vicuña, and grandson of General Juan Mackenna, hero of the Chilean War of Independence. He studied in Santiago, and joined the school of law in 1849. From the beginning of his career he contributed to La Tribuna newspaper, writing political articles. In 1851 he participated in Pedro Urriola's revolution against the government but was taken prisoner during the attack on the headquarters of the Chacabuco Regiment. On 4 July 1851 Vicuña Mackenna and Roberto Souper managed to escape from the prison disguised as women. In 1852 he lived in exile in the United States, and travelled from San Francisco through Mexico and Canada. A year later he studied agronomy in England, and then visited many parts of Europe including Ireland.

Back in Chile, in 1856 Vicuña Mackenna graduated as a lawyer from the Universidad de Chile. Although he did not practice as a barrister, his political and other writings were solidly based on legal knowledge. Together with Isidoro Errázuriz, in 1858 Vicuña Mackenna founded  the newspaper La Asamblea Constitucional. He was expelled by the government and exiled to England, but was allowed to return in 1863. That year he began contributing to El Mercurio newspaper. In 1865 he was in New York as envoy of the Chilean government, and founded La Voz de América newspaper. Elected national senator for a six-year term, in 1872 Benjamín Vicuña Mackenna was also appointed mayor of Santiago. His political career was interrupted in 1875 when he was defeated by Federico Errázuriz Zañartu in the Chilean presidential elections. He dedicated his life to journalism and writing, and in 1880 edited El Nuevo Ferrocarril and La Nación.

Vicuña Mackenna's most important works are 'El sitio de Chillán' (1849), 'La agricultura aplicada a Chile' (published in London, 1853), 'Chili' (Paris, 1855), 'Tres años de viajes' (1856), 'Ostracismo de los Carrera' (1857), 'Historia de la revolución del Perú' (1860), 'Ostracismo de O'Higgins' (1860), 'Diego de Almagro' (1862), 'Historia de la Administración Montt' (1861/62), 'Vida de Don Diego Portales' (1861/62), 'Historia de Santiago' (1868), 'Historia de Chile' (1868), 'Historia de Valparaíso' (1868), 'La guerra a muerte' (1868), 'Francisco Moyen' (1868), and dozens of other novels, history books, and political essays, the most popular being 'El Santa Lucía', 'La unión Americana', 'El cambiazo', 'Seis años en el senado de Chile', and 'El 20 de Abril'.

Like his contemporary Bartolomé Mitre in Argentina, Benjamín Vicuña Mackenna represented the intellectual class of the South American landed elites. They initiated mainstream historiography in their countries, and selected and immortalised the national discourse that served those elites in envisioning a model of national values to be imitated by the middle and working classes.

Vicuña Mackenna Park, which is located in northeastern Chile in XV Arica and Parinacota Region, is named after him.  Avenida Vicuña Mackenna, a major street in Santiago, is also named for him.

See also
Vicuña family
Santa Lucía Hill
Diego de Rosales

Selected bibliography

Sources

External links
 
 

1831 births
1886 deaths
People from Santiago
Benjamin
Chilean people of Basque descent
Benjmin Vicuña
Chilean people of Irish descent
Liberal Party (Chile, 1849) politicians 
Liberal Democratic Party (Chile, 1875) politicians
Deputies of the XIV Legislative Period of the National Congress of Chile
Deputies of the XV Legislative Period of the National Congress of Chile
Deputies of the XVII Legislative Period of the National Congress of Chile
Deputies of the XVIII Legislative Period of the National Congress of Chile
Deputies of the XIX Legislative Period of the National Congress of Chile
Senators of the XIX Legislative Period of the National Congress of Chile
Senators of the XX Legislative Period of the National Congress of Chile
Candidates for President of Chile
19th-century Chilean historians
Chilean journalists
Chilean climatologists
19th-century journalists
Male journalists
19th-century male writers
Instituto Nacional General José Miguel Carrera alumni
University of Chile alumni
People of the 1851 Chilean Revolution